The Ninth Texas Legislature met from November 4, 1861 to March 7, 1863 in its regular session and one called session. All members of the House of Representatives and about half of the members of the Senate were elected in 1861.

Sessions
9th Regular session: November 4, 1861 – January 14, 1862
9th First called session: February 2–March 7, 1863]

Party summary

Officers

Senate
 Lieutenant Governor John McClannahan Crockett
 President pro tempore Robert Henry Guinn, Regular session, First called session

House of Representatives
 Speaker of the House  Constantine W. Buckley, Democrat, November 4, 1861 – December 7, 1861
 Nicholas Henry Darnell, Democrat, 7 December 1861–1862
 Constantine W. Buckley, Democrat, 1863

Members
Members of the Ninth Texas Legislature at the beginning of the regular session, November 4, 1861

Senate

House of Representatives

George H. Bagby
Payton Bethell
Constantine W. Buckley
Horace Cone
Nicholas Henry Darnell
 Robert Turner Flewellen
Sterling Brown Hendricks
Alfred Marmaduke Hobby
James K. Holland
Spearman Holland
Samuel A. Maverick
James G. McDonald
José Ángel Navarro
 John Smith
James D. Woods
William Amos Wortham
Samuel James Polk McDowell

Membership Changes

Senate

House of Representatives

References

External links

9th Texas Legislature
09 Texas Legislature
1860s in Texas
1861 in Texas
1862 in Texas
1861 U.S. legislative sessions
1862 U.S. legislative sessions